Laevilitorina heardensis is a species of sea snail, a marine gastropod mollusk in the family Littorinidae, the winkles or periwinkles.

Description

Distribution

References

 Dell, R.K. (1964). Marine Mollusca from Macquarie and Heard islands. Records of the Dominion Museum 4: 267–301.

Littorinidae
Gastropods described in 1964